The Ministry of Defense (MoD) is a Ministry in Saudi Arabia that is responsible for the protection of national security, interests and sovereignty of the country from external threats as well as the working with all ministries of the state to achieve national security and stability. The current minister of defense is Prince Khalid bin Salman Al Saud, who was appointed on 27 September 2022. The Ministry includes the five service branches of the Saudi Arabian Armed Forces: The Royal Saudi Land Force, The Royal Saudi Air Force, The Royal Saudi Naval Force, The Royal Saudi Air Defense Force and the Royal Saudi Strategic Missile Force.  

In 2017, Saudi Arabia has ranked third in the world with military spending and by far the largest military spender in the Middle East. With an allocated budget of $69.4 billion representing 10% of the country's gross domestic product (GDP), Saudi Arabia replaced Russia, which ranked fourth in military spending according to the Stockholm International Peace Research Institute (SIPRI). SIPRI also stated that Saudi Arabia is the most well-armed country in the Persian Gulf region in terms of its inventory of modern equipment.

History 
Military Affairs Administration – In 1929, A royal order was issued by King Abdulaziz, the founder of Saudi Arabia, to create the Military Affairs Administration to deal with military issues and build a strong army. The army was organized into three units: machine gun, infantry and artillery units.
Defense Agency – In addition to the Military Affairs Administration, the Defense Agency was established by King Abdulaziz’s order in 1934 as a requirement of the expansion and modernization where further detachments were created and distributed over the cities and seaports of the country.
General Staff Presidency – In 1939, the General Staff Presidency was established replacing the Military Affairs Administration.
Ministry of Defense and Aviation – In 1943, the Ministry of Defense was created replacing the Defense Agency, later in 1952, its name was changed to the Ministry of Defense and Aviation.
Ministry of Defense – In 2011, the Ministry of Defense and Aviation was renamed to be Ministry of Defense.

Ministers of Defense 
 Mansour bin Abdulaziz Al Saud (10 November 1943 – 2 May 1951)
 Mishaal bin Abdulaziz Al Saud (12 May 1951 – 1953)
 Fahad bin Saud bin Abdulaziz Al Saud (1957 – 1960)
 Muhammed bin Saud Al Saud (1960 – 22 October 1963)
 Sultan bin Abdulaziz Al Saud (22 October 1963 – 22 October 2011) 
 Salman bin Abdulaziz Al Saud (5 November 2011 – 23 January 2015)
 Mohammed bin Salman (23 January 2015 – 27 September 2022)
 Khalid bin Salman Al Saud (27 September 2022 – present)

Flags of the Armed Forces

See also

 Armed Forces of Saudi Arabia
 Chairman of the General Staff
 Ministry of War (Saudi Arabia)

References

External links

  
 Minister of Defense at Global Security

 
1944 establishments in Saudi Arabia
Ministries established in 1933
Defense
Saudi Arabia